The Crasta Mora is a mountain of the Albula Alps, overlooking Bever in the canton of Graubünden. It lies at the eastern end of the range between the Albula Pass and the Val Bever.

References

External links 
 Crasta Mora on Hikr

Mountains of Switzerland
Mountains of Graubünden
Mountains of the Alps
Alpine three-thousanders
Two-thousanders of Switzerland
Bever, Switzerland